Syaulibang is a village and Village Development Committee in Pyuthan, a Middle Hills district of Rapti Zone, western Nepal.

Etymology

In Khamkura Syauli means apple.  Bang means a high field or pasture, usually above 2,000 meters where snow can fall, suggesting a climate with enough winter cold for cultivating apples, so 'Apple Orchard' is a reasonable translation of this place name.

Geography and Climate
Syaulibang is Pyuthan district's northernmost VDC, bordering Gaam VDC in Rolpa to the northwest and Baglung district's [ Nisi and Bohoragau VDC now Nisikhola Gaupalika Nepal|Bowang]] and Taman VDCs to the northeast.  Syaulibang is also Pyuthan's highest VDC, ranging from about  up to a  summit at the meeting point of Syaulibang, Gaam and Bowang VDCs on the lekh that is the Rapti-Gandaki divide.

Villages in this VDC

References

External links
UN map of VDC boundaries, water features and roads in Pyuthan District

Populated places in Pyuthan District